Statistics of Moldovan National Division for the 1997–98 season.

Overview
It was contested by 14 teams and Zimbru Chişinău won the championship.

League standings

Results

References
Moldova - List of final tables (RSSSF)

Moldovan Super Liga seasons
1997–98 in Moldovan football
Moldova